Stade de France–Saint-Denis is a railway station serving Saint-Denis, a northern suburb of Paris in Seine-Saint-Denis department, France. It is near the Stade de France, on the RER D suburban railway line. It is on the Paris–Lille railway.

As part of the Grand Paris Express project, a bridge over the railway tracks will connect the station to the new Saint-Denis Pleyel station, which will serve 4 Métro lines. Saint-Denis Pleyel will open in time for the Olympic and Paralympic Games in 2024, with an extension of Line 14.

References

External links

 

Réseau Express Régional stations
Railway stations in Seine-Saint-Denis
Railway stations in France opened in 1998
Sport in Saint-Denis, Seine-Saint-Denis